Kwasu Library is the main library for Kwara State University. It was established in 2009 to meet the learning purposes of Kwasu.

History 
The institution library was established in 2009. It was set up in the College of Pure & Applied Science before the building was moved to College of Agriculture & Veterinary with the virtual library brought about in 2012. The main library is at Molete, a reading section at Oke Osi and Ilesha-baruba. The library building was opened to public in 2020 after it was commissioned and named after president Muhammad Buhari on July 6, 2019. The structure is located in the Kwara State University campus in Ilorin.

See also 
Kwasu FM
List of libraries in Nigeria

References

External links 
 Kwasu library
 President Buhari commissioned kwasu library

Kwara State University
Academic libraries in Nigeria